OSSA as an acronym may refer to:

 Office of the Special Adviser on Africa, a United Nations initiative
 Organizational Systems Security Analyst, an information security certification
 Star of South Africa, Officer, a non-military class of the Order of the Star of South Africa

See also
Ossa (disambiguation)